"Requiem" is a song performed by French singer Alma. The song was released as a digital download on 13 January 2017 through Warner Music France as the second single from her debut studio album Ma peau aime, and was written by Nazim Khaled. It represented France in the Eurovision Song Contest 2017. The Eurovision version of the song was revealed on 11 March 2017.

Eurovision Song Contest

On 9 February 2017, Alma was announced as the French representative to the Eurovision Song Contest 2017, with the song "Requiem". As France is a member of the "Big Five", she automatically advanced to the final, held on 13 May 2017 in Kyiv, Ukraine.

It was discovered during the week of 17 February 2017 that the artist's song had been recorded and performed prior to the EBU's submission deadline, 1 September 2016, which therefore violated the EBU's song submission policy. Further research shows that Alma's song was performed at the end of January 2015. While the French broadcaster had claimed they were not in breach of the EBU's submission rules, there had been no ultimate decision regarding the disqualification of France 2 from the contest up until then. It was reported on 21 February 2017 that Alma and her crew were in the production of a bilingual version of her song—the two languages being French and English—which implies that the act has ultimately not been disqualified from the contest.

Track listing

Other Versions
7th Heaven Remix

Charts

Release history

References

Eurovision songs of France
Eurovision songs of 2017
2016 songs
2017 singles
French-language songs
Warner Music France singles
Songs written by Nazim Khaled